Physopleurus is a genus of beetles in the family Cerambycidae, containing the following species:

 Physopleurus amazonicus Fragoso & Monné, 1995
 Physopleurus antonkozlovi Santos-Silva & Botero, 2016
 Physopleurus crassidens (Bates, 1869)
 Physopleurus dohrnii Lacordaire, 1869
 Physopleurus erikae Santos-Silva & Martins, 2009
 Physopleurus exiguus Santos-Silva & Martins, 2003
 Physopleurus longiscapus Lameere, 1912
 Physopleurus maillei Audinet-Serville, 1832
 Physopleurus rafaeli Santos-Silva, 2006
 Physopleurus rugosus Gahan, 1894
 Physopleurus tritomicros Lameere, 1912
 Physopleurus ubirajarai Delahaye & Tavakilian, 2015
 Physopleurus villardi (Lameere, 1902)

References

Prioninae